A hydraulic press is a machine press using a hydraulic cylinder to generate a compressive force. It uses the hydraulic equivalent of a mechanical lever, and was also known as a Bramah press after the inventor, Joseph Bramah, of England. He invented and was issued a patent on this press in 1795. As Bramah (who is also known for his development of the flush toilet) installed toilets, he studied the existing literature on the motion of fluids and put this knowledge into the development of the press.

Main principle
The hydraulic press depends on Pascal's principle-the pressure throughout a closed system is constant. One part of the system is a piston acting as a pump, with a modest mechanical force acting on a small cross-sectional area; the other part is a piston with a larger area which generates a correspondingly large mechanical force. Only small-diameter tubing (which more easily resists pressure) is needed if the pump is separated from the press cylinder.

Pascal's law: Pressure on a confined fluid is transmitted undiminished and acts with equal force on equal areas and at 90 degrees to the container wall.

Pressure of fluid due to the application force F1

                          (1)

Resulting force F2 on the larger cylinder due to the pressure of the fluid. With A1 and A2 being the areas of cylinder 1 and 2 respectively.

     (2)

                       (3)

A small effort force acts on a small piston. This creates a pressure which is transferred through the hydraulic fluid to apply a greater force on the larger piston.

Application
Hydraulic presses are commonly used for forging, clinching, moulding, blanking, punching, deep drawing, and metal forming operations. Hydraulic presses are also used for stretch forming, rubber pad forming, and powder compacting.
 The hydraulic press is advantageous in manufacturing, it gives the ability to create more intricate shapes and can be economical with materials. A hydraulic press will take up less space compared to a mechanical press of the same capability.

In geology a tungsten carbide coated hydraulic press is used in the rock crushing stage of preparing samples for geochemical analyses in topics such as understanding the origins of volcanism.

In popular culture

The room featured in Fermat's Room has a design similar to that of a hydraulic press. Boris Artzybasheff also created a drawing of a hydraulic press, in which the press was created out of the shape of a robot.

In 2015, the Hydraulic Press Channel, a YouTube channel dedicated to crushing objects with a hydraulic press, was created by Lauri Vuohensilta, a factory owner from Tampere, Finland. The Hydraulic Press Channel has since grown to over 3 million subscribers on YouTube. There are numerous other YouTube channels that publish videos involving hydraulic presses that are tasked with crushing many different items, such as bowling balls, soda cans, plastic toys and metal tools.

A hydraulic press  features prominently in the Sherlock Holmes story "The Adventure of the Engineer's Thumb".

See also
 Universal testing machine

References

External links 

Hydraulic machinery
Press tools
Machine tools
Metalworking tools